Smail Balić (26 August 1920 – 14 March 2002) was a Bosnian-Austrian historian, culturologist and scholar. Most of his life was spent abroad. He was employed at various archival and historicist positions, especially in German-speaking countries. Until 1986 he performed a number of significant scientific and archival functions such as a researcher of the Institute for the History of Arabic-Islamic Science at the Goethe University Frankfurt, a member of the Association of Austrian writers, and a corresponding member of the Jordanian Islamic Academy of science. He died in Vienna in 2002.

Biography
Balić was born 26 August 1920 (although a few sources give 20 August 1920) in Mostar, Bosnia and Herzegovina, to a Muslim Bosniak family. In 1995, Balić received the Austrian Cross of Honour for Science and Art, 1st class

Bibliography

Kultura Bošnjaka (1973)
Ruf vom Minaret (1984)
Das unbekannte Bosnien (1992)

References

1920 births
2002 deaths
Bosniaks of Bosnia and Herzegovina
Bosnia and Herzegovina Muslims
20th-century Austrian historians
Recipients of the Austrian Cross of Honour for Science and Art, 1st class
Yugoslav emigrants to Austria
Austrian expatriates in Germany
Cultural history of Bosnia and Herzegovina